The Arabic-language magazine An-Nibrās (النبراس;The Lantern) appeared once a month in 1909 und 1910 in Beirut. The founder and publisher was Mustafa al-Ghalayini, a well-known Lebanese theologian, writer and reformer. In addition to scientific articles and findings, An-Nibrās focused on cultural topics. The reader informed about literary and historical facts. Especially the criticism of politics and society played a major role for al-Ghalayini. Religious topics were not of primary importance but were covered as well. Subscriptions were offered outside of Lebanon not only to Egypt but also to United States and India.

References

Arabic-language magazines
Cultural magazines
Defunct magazines published in Lebanon
Magazines established in 1909
Magazines disestablished in 1910
Magazines published in Beirut
Monthly magazines published in Lebanon